Antonio Parra Velasco (born Guayaquil, Ecuador; December 17, 1900 – October 28, 1994) was an Ecuadorian thinker, diplomat, and internationalist.

Velasco served as Ecuador's ambassador to France, Great Britain and Venezuela, and was awarded the "Premio Eugenio Espejo" in 1987 in the culture category.

About Antonio Parra Velasco 
He studied at the Lycée Janson-de-Sailly. He graduated with a Bachelor of Philosophy from the Sorbonne University.He was a Rector of the University of Guayaquil from 1957 to 1963. He graduated as a lawyer at the University of Guayaquil.

References 

1900 births
1994 deaths
Ecuadorian diplomats
People from Guayaquil
Ambassadors of Ecuador to France
Ambassadors of Ecuador to the United Kingdom
Guayaquil